Riverview is a census-designated place (CDP) in Kent County, Delaware, United States. It is part of the Dover, Delaware Metropolitan Statistical Area. The population was 2,456 at the 2010 census.

Geography

Demographics

As of the census of 2000, there were 1,583 people, 560 households, and 455 families residing in the CDP. The racial makeup of the CDP was 88.44% White, 7.26% African American, 0.25% Native American, 1.52% Asian, 0.06% Pacific Islander, 1.07% from other races, and 1.39% from two or more races.  2.27% of the population were Hispanic or Latino of any race.

There were 560 households, out of which 41.4% had children under the age of 18 living with them, 69.3% were married couples living together, 8.4% had a female householder with no husband present, and 18.6% are non-families. 13.8% of all households were made up of individuals, and 3.4% had someone living alone who is 65 years of age or older.  The average household size was 2.83 and the average family size was 3.09.

In the CDP, the population was spread out, with 28.1% under the age of 18, 7.4% from 18 to 24, 33.0% from 25 to 44, 24.1% from 45 to 64, and 7.3% who are 65 years of age or older.  The median age was 36 years.  For every 100 females, there were 98.1 males.  For every 100 females age 18 and over, there were 94.5 males.

The median income for a household in the CDP was $64,219, and the median income for a family was $66,250. Males had a median income of $39,458 versus $24,605 for females. The per capita income for the CDP was $22,766.  1.9% of the population and 0.9% of families were below the poverty line.  Out of the total population, 2.4% of those under the age of 18 and none of those 65 and older were living below the poverty line.

Education
Most of Riverview is in the Lake Forest School District. That area's zoned high school is Lake Forest High School.

Some of Riverview is located in the Caesar Rodney School District. Portions are zoned to Star Hill Elementary School, in an unincorporated area, and in turn are zoned to Postlethwait Middle School, in Rising Sun-Lebanon. Caesar Rodney High School in Camden is the comprehensive high school for the entire district.

References

Census-designated places in Kent County, Delaware
Census-designated places in Delaware